The Delta Prize for Global Understanding, presented annually by Delta Air Lines and the University of Georgia, recognizes individuals or groups whose initiatives have helped promote world peace as well as globally significant efforts that provide opportunities for greater understanding among nations and cultures. Such efforts can include grassroots projects that diminish hostilities in a particular part of the world, international programs that promote communication or trade among different peoples, and/or leadership that inspires global cooperation and peace.

The prize includes a $10,000 cash grant and an original work of art designed by Barbara Mann and Gary Lee Noffke of the University of Georgia's Lamar Dodd School of Art .

Laureates

External links

Delta Prize for Global Understanding Homepage

Delta Prize for Global Understanding
Delta Air Lines